The peerage title of Viscount Launceston, named for Launceston in Cornwall, has been twice created, each time for an individual connected with the British Royal Family.

The first creation was in the Peerage of Great Britain, when Prince Frederick Lewis, eldest son of the Prince of Wales, was created Duke of Edinburgh, Marquess of the Isle of Ely, Earl of Eltham, Viscount of Launceston and Baron of Snaudon, on 26 July 1726. These titles merged with the Crown when the grantee's son succeeded as King George III on 25 October 1760.

The second creation was in the Peerage of the United Kingdom, when Sir Alexander Mountbatten (formerly Prince Alexander of Battenberg), eldest son of the late Prince Henry of Battenberg and of Princess Beatrice of the United Kingdom, was created Marquess of Carisbrooke, Earl of Berkhampsted and Viscount Launceston, on 18 July 1917. These titles became extinct on the grantee's death on 23 February 1960.

First creation (1726)
see Duke of Edinburgh, first creation

The precise text of the Gazette, for this creation reads "Viscount of Launceston". It is, however, common to see the "of" retroactively dropped in modern references.

Second creation (1917)
see Marquess of Carisbrooke

References

External links

Peerages.info

Launceston, Cornwall
British and Irish peerages which merged in the Crown
Noble titles created in 1726
Extinct viscountcies in the Peerage of Great Britain
Noble titles created in 1917
Extinct viscountcies in the Peerage of the United Kingdom